The Monitor or Over-Monitor, also known as Mar Novu, is a fictional character created by writer Marv Wolfman and artist George Pérez as one of the main characters of DC Comics' Crisis on Infinite Earths limited series.

The character began appearing, along with his assistant Lyla Michaels, in numerous DC Comics titles beginning in 1982, three years before the Crisis began in July 1985; these appearances made it seem that he was some sort of weapons dealer for supervillains. This was all part of the setup Wolfman and the staff of DC Comics planned for the Crisis, showing the Monitor currying favor with villains such as Maxie Zeus, prior to calling on the heroes. The Monitor was depicted in the shadows for all of his appearances in DC's mainstream superhero titles, and his face was first revealed in one of their few remaining non-superhero titles, the war comic G.I. Combat issue #274.

LaMonica Garrett portrayed the character on The CW's Arrowverse, debuting during the 2018 crossover Elseworlds. This marked the first live-action adaptation of the character. The character has made subsequent appearances on several shows set in the Arrowverse. The character also appeared in the 2019 crossover Crisis on Infinite Earths.

Origin of the concept
Wolfman conceived the concept of the character long before plans for Crisis on Infinite Earths.  He explained it in a 1983 interview in the Comics Journal:

"I had the character about 18 years ago. I called him the Librarian then because I didn’t have a good sense about names and thought that it would be a neat idea to do that. You know, one villain that the whole company could use. I didn’t have to sell it to Marvel, because they already had one universe, but when I came back to DC I indicated that I wanted to do it here. Everyone liked it but forgot to hand out the sheets I gave for their writers. So I have to redo it indicating how far you can take the character from month A to month B. Like for three months you can only show this much and after six months you can show that much, and at the end of a year we can reveal who that character is and start getting into interesting stories that all the writers can pick up on."

Fictional character biography

Origins
Thirteen billion years ago, the Multiverse was born due to tampering with the creation of the universe by Krona, a scientist from the planet Maltus who was attempting to view the beginning of the universe.  As a result of his actions, an infinite number of parallel universes were brought into existence side by side, separated only by minuscule vibrational differences, none of them as strong as the single universe that existed earlier would have been. Krona's experiment made it a multiverse instead of one single universe.

Monitor was born on Oa's moon, apparently as the living embodiment of all positive matter universes. One of these universes was composed entirely of antimatter, and on the moon of Oa's counterpart, Qward, a hideous mockery of life was born from its very soil, a being that would come to be known as the Anti-Monitor.

The Long War
As the evil Anti-Monitor conquered his universe, the Monitor watched him, and, when the Anti-Monitor sensed his presence, they began battling across the dimensional barrier in a war that lasted one million years.

A simultaneous attack rendered them both unconscious, and they lay unmoving for more than nine billion years until the Monitor felt his evil counterpart awaken, as a result of another experiment on the creation of the universe by another scientist, which resulted in the destruction of that scientist's universe. He found this scientist, a man who would become known as Pariah, and used him to follow the Anti-Monitor's path of destruction in his newly created spaceship.

As the Anti-Monitor consumed worlds with his destructive antimatter, thus increasing his power as his antimatter universe expanded to fill the 'gap' that had been left by the loss of the universe, the Monitor grew weaker. He studied every universe for the means to fight the Anti-Monitor, but, even though countless universes were threatened, he took the time to save an orphaned girl, the only survivor of a shipwreck, and raised her on his ship.

That girl, Lyla Michaels, grew up to become Harbinger, having been granted great powers by the Monitor. The Monitor went so far as to provide supervillains with technology, supposedly for money but in reality as a way to test the heroes and villains of Earth and find out which ones might help his cause.

Crisis

When the Anti-Monitor's antimatter wave began approaching the main Earths of the Multiverse, the Monitor directed Harbinger to track down an initial force of fifteen specific heroes and villains the Monitor needed to fight his foe (this initial group featured Superman, Doctor Polaris, Dawnstar, Firebrand, Geo-Force, Obsidian, Cyborg, Killer Frost (with her mind temporarily altered to make her more accommodating), Firestorm, Psycho-Pirate, Solovar, Blue Beetle, Psimon, Green Lantern, and Arion). He explained to them what was going on and sent them to protect giant tower-like devices that he had created on several places across space and time; his plan was to merge the surviving Earths into a single one that could resist the Anti-Monitor's attack. He also sent Harbinger to recover the infant Alexander Luthor, Jr., the sole survivor of Earth-Three, who he believed would be of invaluable assistance.

When Harbinger returned, one of her incarnations had been attacked by one of the Anti-Monitor's shadow demons, and that corruption caused her combined self to attack and kill the Monitor. However, he had foreseen the attack and used his death to power the machines that would pull Earth-One and Earth-Two into a netherverse created from the energies liberated by his own death, saving them from the Anti-Monitor's unstoppable antimatter wall. He left Lyla a recorded message explaining this, trusting that she and the Multiverse's heroes would complete the job and preserve the worlds before their vibration slowed down to an extent where they would destroy each other as they existed in the same place simultaneously.

Harbinger followed the Monitor's legacy, using up her powers to draw the last three Earths (Earth-Four, Earth-S, and Earth-X) into the Netherverse. With help from Pariah, Alexander, and all the surviving heroes and villains from the various Earths, she eventually defeated the Anti-Monitor at the dawn of time, and then in his own antimatter universe, saving the reborn universe from his predations. These actions resulted in a "reboot" of the multiverse as a single universe, creating an amalgam of the five surviving Earths which possessed the strength to resist the Anti-Monitor's attack.

The existence of the scheming but benevolent Monitor has apparently been forgotten by everyone except his closest associates as a result of the change in history.

The Monitors

During the events of Infinite Crisis, Alexander Luthor, Jr. revives the multiverse by splitting the merged Earths in an effort to find a "perfect earth", because he believed the surviving Earth to be corrupted. His plan is thwarted by Conner Kent, who destroys the tower he created to splinter the Earth. The re-collapse of the Earths resulted in excess energy that created a wholly new multiverse consisting of 52 identical Earths. Luthor's use of the Anti-Monitor's armor to recreate the Multiverse acted as a "seed program" to proliferate all cloned universes with their own Monitor. The histories of the 52 Earths were changed as a result of Mister Mind's multi-dimensional rampage. As a result of there being worlds with different histories, the Monitors now work as a collective to prevent interaction between the universes that could lead to a new Crisis.

Final Crisis
A new metafictional origin for the Monitors, including the first one featured in Crisis on Infinite Earths, is later given during the Final Crisis.

It is revealed that the Monitor himself was nothing but a probe sent by an unseen, yet powerful being, an Overmonitor, the Original Monitor, an incorporeal and unfathomable being of limitless imagination who became aware of the concept of stories by stumbling upon the original Multiverse, which existed as a minute lesion within itself. Willing to understand it fully, he fashioned a probe allowing him to interact with the budding universes. Corrupted by the sheer complexity of the Multiverse, the probe was split into two symmetrical and complementary beings: the Monitor and the Anti-Monitor, a being of pure good and a being of pure evil battling one against the other as told in the Crisis on Infinite Earths.

The attempt to know and map the universe was deemed a partial success, as after the death and the rebirth of the Universe from Dax Novu, the firstborn of the Monitors (it's still uncertain if Dax Novu was meant to be the Monitor himself or a later creation of the Overmonitor), a new race of Monitors was spawned in the World of Nil, the netherworld surrounding the universe. These Monitors, made each one different by accepting the concept of time and mortality, became a race of cosmic vampires, feasting and needing stories to stay alive. On their world, they grew in time a fascination with the Superman mythology, the very first story they came to know, employing a thought robot with the appearance of the original Superman (the Earth-1 version) to guard them against menaces. The same concept of time and mortality, and the repressed loathing the original Monitor had for the germs, the beings living in the Multiverse, turned Dax Novu into Mandrakk, the Dark Monitor, the negation of life itself. Superman, inhabiting the Thought Robot, defeats Mandrakk/Dax Novu. Later, a different incarnation of Mandrakk (Rox Ogama) battles his son, Nix Uotan, and is killed during the Final Crisis by the Green Lanterns.

In the end, Superman heals the damaged Multiverse with a replica of the Miracle Machine. Nix Uotan, now with the appearance of a human being living in Metropolis, retains his role as the sole link between the Overmonitor and the Multiverse.

DC Rebirth
In the DC Rebirth relaunch, Monitor is found alive inside the central cave of the newly-discovered Dark Multiverse.

Monitor's history is revealed where he and his brothers Anti-Monitor and World Forger were created by a Super Celestial named Perpetua in the Sixth Dimension where she tasked them to monitor their assigned realms. Monitor was tasked to monitor the Multiverse. If Monitor, his brothers, or Perpetua would be destroyed, they would regenerate in the Sixth Dimension.

Powers and abilities
Monitor's powers were never well defined, but he was able to sense his counterpart's existence in the anti-matter universe and fight with him to a stalemate in Oa's moon using energy powers (though the feedback of the attack placed him in suspended animation for eons).

He was able to save Pariah (and possibly empower him to never die and be always drawn to where the Anti-Monitor was about to strike next) and create an entire satellite headquarters out of nothingness.

As a Monitor, he can, as told by Metron, "Create with a thought".

Other versions
 A Monitor appears in Tiny Titans issues 12, 18 and 35.

 The Monitors play prominent roles in the comic book continuation of the television series Smallville. However, in the mini-series Smallville: Alien it is revealed that the Monitors are not benevolent, but are actively pursuing the destruction of the Multiverse with one named Ray-Lan having crash landed in Russia. While being held captive he is interrogated by Lex Luthor under orders of the President after his destruction of Earth-Two. Ray-Lan then escapes with a powered exoskeleton to combat the Rocket Reds to search for his ship which is located in Chernobyl escaping Superman. While Lex and Clark explore Monitor's spacecraft, Ray-Lan attacks and in the chaos, Superman saves Lex and destroys his ship, causing shrapnel to kill Ray-Lan via impalement. The deceased Monitor's body is taken to the Department of Extranormal Operations Quarantine Zone for observation.

In other media

Mar Novu / The Monitor made his live-action appearance in the Arrowverse, portrayed by LaMonica Garrett. Novu was born on the planet Maltus where he conducted experiments in attempts to access the multiverse. During the process, he enters a realm called the anti-matter universe where he sets free his evil counterpart Mobius, later called the Anti-Monitor. Eventually, Novu seals the universe so that Mobius can’t escape. Novu begins testing different worlds using the Book of Destiny to find heroes to prevent a coming crisis. After mass murdering Earth-90’s heroes, except for their Flash who managed to survive, Novu travels to Earth-1 where he gives the book to Dr. John Deegan. Deegan uses the book to swap the lives of Barry Allen and Oliver Queen. Eventually, the heroes convince their teammates of the misunderstanding. The Flash from Earth-90 arrives to inform the heroes of Earth-1 about Novu, now going by the Monitor. Barry, Oliver and Earth-90 Flash confront the Monitor who breaches Earth-90 Flash away. Before they can confront the Monitor, the Monitor teleports away and gives Deegan another chance in rewriting reality. After doing so, Oliver learns of Barry and Kara’s deaths and confronts Novu in his realm. Oliver requests Novu to spare Barry and Kara, but Novu demands something in exchange from Oliver. Oliver defeats Deegan and reality is restored. Deegan is imprisoned at Arkham Asylum where one of his cellmate taunt Deegan about the universe never being the same again. Following the Elseworlds, Novu recruits Oliver while also informing him he dies during the Crisis. Novu sends Oliver throughout the multiverse on several missions that will help him defeat the Anti-Monitor including retrieving drawf star particles from Earth-2, retrieving Dr. Robert Wong in Hong Kong, and finally retrieve plutonium from Lian Yu. Oliver also learns that Lyla Michaels is working with Novu. Novu brings Oliver’s children from the future to assist Oliver in his mission. His son William help bring the weapon together which Lyla activates and absorbs all the energy from the island before portalling her way off the island. Sometime later, Lyla, now a Harbinger of things to come, recruits Oliver and Mia from the island as the skies turn red. Lyla later recruits Barry, Kate Kane / Batwoman, Clark Kent / Superman, Kara Danvers / Supergirl, Sara Lance and Ray Palmer to Earth-38 where the heroes make their stand to save the citizens of Earth-38 from being destroyed by anti-matter. After successfully doing so at the cost of Oliver’s life, the Monitor takes the heroes to Earth-1. Harbinger retrieves the Waverider of Earth-74 as the heroes’ headquarters. There, the Monitor reveals seven Paragons which is revealed to be Barry, Sara, Kate, Kara, J’onn J’onzz, Superman of Earth-96 and Ryan Choi. Before the anti-matter wave can destroy the rest of the universe, the Anti-Monitor arrives on the Waverider to kill the Monitor. It is revealed later that he was brought back to life due to the rise of the new Multiverse, shown alive in the year 2040 as he reunites Felicity Smoak and Oliver in the afterlife.

References

External links
 Alan Kistler's DC Crisis Files – Comic book historian Alan Kistler's detailed articles on the Crisis and related events, such as Infinite Crisis and Final Crisis.

DC Comics aliens
DC Comics characters with superhuman strength
DC Comics deities
DC Comics extraterrestrial superheroes
DC Comics extraterrestrial supervillains
DC Comics superheroes
DC Comics supervillains
Characters created by Marv Wolfman
Characters created by George Pérez
Comics characters introduced in 1982